Seeburg is a municipality in the district of Göttingen, in Lower Saxony, Germany. It contains two villages, Seeburg and Bernshausen. It lies at the Seeburger See and is part of the Eichsfeld.

References 

Göttingen (district)

uz:Seeburg